Resin soap is a mix of salts (usually sodium) of resin acids (usually mainly abietic acid). It is a yellow gelatinous pasty soap with use in bleaching and cleaning and as a compound of some varnishes. It also finds use in rubber industry.

Resin soap is made by reacting resin acids in wood with sodium hydroxide, as a byproduct of the Kraft process for manufacturing wood pulp. It is also called Kraft soap.

Acidification of the resin soap produces tall oil.

Pine soap is refined from resin soap via tall oil by acidification, refining and resaponification.

References

Resins
Soaps